Coolie ('Porter') is a 1997 Bangladeshi Dhallywood action comedy film, directed by Montazur Rahman Akbar and written by Abdullah Zahir Babu. AK Siddique produced the films under the banner of Flamingo Movies. The film stars Omar Sani and Sadika Parvin Popy leading role with supporting roles played by Amin Khan, Dildar, Humayun Faridi, Dolly Johur and more. The film actress Sadika Parvin Popy started her career with the film.

Cast
 Omar Sani - Raju Coolie
 Popy - Poppy, Raju's wife
 Amin Khan - Babu Driver, Ruju's friend
 Humayun Faridi - Keramat Ali Bepari, Poppy's father
 Dolly Johur - Raju's mother
 Mizu Ahmed - Badru, Rail station gangster
 Dildar - Asgar
 Marjina - Asgar's wife
 Anisur Rahman - Matchmaker
 Ali Amjad - Janab Chowdhury
 Syed Akhtar Ali - Old Porter
 Jahanara - Poppys Aunty
 Songeeta - Rupa, Poppy's sister
 Farhad -

Released
The film was released on 16 May 1997 on the occasion of Eid al-Fitr. It grossed ৳7crores ($1.6M as of May 1997), making it the highest-grossing Bangladeshi film of 1997.

Music 
Coolie's music is directed by Alam Khan. The songs are performed by  Andrew Kishore, Runa Laila, Rizia Parveen, Doly Sayontoni and Humayun Faridi. Most of the songs of this film became very popular by the audience, especially Akashete Lakkho Tara sung by Rizia Parvin & Andrew Kishore

Track listing

References

External links

 

1997 films
1997 romantic drama films
Bengali-language Bangladeshi films
Bangladeshi romantic drama films
Films scored by Alam Khan
1990s Bengali-language films
Films directed by Montazur Rahman Akbar